Lisa Lambe  is an Irish singer, actress, and songwriter.

Acting career
Lisa graduated with a degree in acting from Trinity College Dublin. She was nominated for a Best Actress Award at the Irish Times Theatre Awards for her performance in the lead role of Philomena O Shea in Rough Magic's musical Improbable Frequency. She has been described by the Irish Times as "the finest singer and actor of her generation."

Some of Lisa's theatrical play roles have included: Anna Karenina and Johanna in Sweeney Todd at the Gate Theatre; Oonagh in Jimmy's Hall and Lil - written especially for her- in The Country Girls by Edna O'Brien, and Patsy in The Unmanageable Sisters at the Abbey Theatre; Sorcha in Ross O'Carroll-Kelly's The Last Days of the Celtic Tiger, Breaking Dad, Between Foxrock and a Hard Place at the Gaiety Theatre and Nora in A Doll's House at the Helix Theatre.

She played Elizabeth O'Farrell in The Bloody Irish, written for PBS in 2015.

Music career

Lisa is a featured soloist and performs regularly with Ireland's RTE Concert Orchestra.

Lisa was a member of Celtic Woman from 2010 to 2014 during which time she appeared on the albums: Believe, Home For Christmas, and Emerald: Musical Gems.

Her first album Hiding Away was recorded in Nashville and released in 2015.  The single "Heaven" from this album featured some of the members of ALONE Ireland, a charity with which Lambe is affiliated. She released her second solo album Juniper in 2020.  It was written in Connemara and recorded in Donegal Ireland with producer Karl Odlum, and has been described as "a love letter to nature." Lisa released her third solo album Wild Red in November, 2021. Her new album was BBC Radio's album of the week and Goldmine USA Magazine Top 100 songs of 2021.

She is a regular recording artist for many film projects including the soundtrack of Float Like a Butterfly and An Klondike.

Filmography

 Float Like a Butterfly Samson Films 
 RTE Thanks for the Memories: Brendan Grace 
 Bachelors Walk (TV series)
 The Bloody Irish! Songs of the 1916 Rising on PBS

Discography

Solo 
 Hiding Away 2015
 Juniper released April 3, 2020 
 Wild Red 2021

with Celtic Woman 
 A Celtic Christmas 2011
 Believe 2012
 Home for Christmas 2012
 Emerald – Musical Gems 2014

References

External links

 
 
 
 

Celtic Woman members
Living people
1987 births
21st-century Irish women singers
Irish women singer-songwriters
Irish actresses